Laura Turner (born 16 October 1983) is an English professional darts player who plays in World Darts Federation (WDF) events.

Career 
Turner made her World Championship debut at the 2019 BDO World Darts Championship, losing 2–0 to Anastasia Dobromyslova of Russia in the first round (last 16).

Personal life
Turner is married to darts player Aaron Turner from Byfleet, Surrey. She was part of the commentary team for the Sky TV coverage of the 2020 PDC World Darts Championship and the 2020 PDC World Matchplay as well as the 2020 PDC World Grand Prix.

World Championship results

BDO/WDF
 2019: First round (lost to Anastasia Dobromyslova 0–2)
 2020: Quarter-finals (lost to Corrine Hammond 0–2)
 2022: First round (lost to Mikuru Suzuki 0–2)
 2023:

External links
 Laura Turner's profile and stats on Darts Database

References

Living people
English darts players
1983 births
British Darts Organisation players
Darts commentators
Professional Darts Corporation women's players